The Church-Wellesley Review was a Canadian literary magazine.

Launched in 1990 as a quarterly supplement in Xtra!, the Review published literary work by LGBT writers. It was founded by and originally overseen by Xtra! staff editor Jeffrey Round with assistance from freelance contributor Peter Hawkins.

The Review won an international design award from Publish in 1992.

Noted writers who were published in the Review early in their careers included Brian Francis, Dale Peck, Debra Anderson, George K. Ilsley, Jane Eaton Hamilton, Daniel David Moses, Billeh Nickerson, R.M. Vaughan and Marnie Woodrow; the Review also sometimes published work by established writers such as Timothy Findley, Jane Rule, David Watmough, Patrick Roscoe and Shyam Selvadurai.

Xtra! discontinued the Review in 2000. It was briefly continued as a separate online publication, but folded by 2002.

References

1990s LGBT literature
1990 establishments in Ontario
2002 disestablishments in Ontario
LGBT-related magazines published in Canada
Online magazines published in Canada
Quarterly magazines published in Canada
Defunct literary magazines published in Canada
LGBT literature in Canada
Magazines established in 1990
Magazines disestablished in 2002
Magazines published in Toronto
Newspaper supplements
Online literary magazines